Cabela's Big Game Hunter 6 was the fifth sequel to the original Cabela's Big Game Hunter.

External links

2002 video games
Windows games
Windows-only games
Activision games
Cabela's video games
Video games developed in the United States